Camille Pascal is a French writer and senior civil servant.

After having held the position of secretary general and director of communication of the France Télévisions group, he was adviser to President Nicolas Sarkozy between 2011 and 2012. He is the winner of the 2018 Grand Prix du roman de l'Académie française.

He has served on the Council of State since 2012.

Awards and honors

Decorations 
  Chevalier de l'ordre national du Mérite (2007) 
  Chevalier de l'ordre des Palmes académiques (2003)
  Officier de l'ordre des Arts et des Lettres (2019)
  Commandeur de l'ordre de Saint-Grégoire-le-Grand (2008)
  Chevalier grand-officier catégorie de mérite, de l'ordre sacré et militaire constantinien de Saint-Georges (2016)
  Officier de l'ordre pro Merito Melitensi (2012)

Prizes 
 Prix du Cercle des amis de Montesquieu, for Le Goût du Roi (2008).
 Prix du livre incorrect, for Ainsi dieu choisit la France (2017).
 Grand prix du roman de l'Académie française, for L'Été des quatre rois (2018).

 Since 2003, Camille Pascal has been an associate member of the Académie des sciences morales, des lettres et des arts de Versailles et d'Île-de-France.

Publications

Collective work 
For Foreseen, International Observatory of Sociological Trends:
 1998 : L’Alternative des valeurs féminines, éd. Denoël, 188 p. 
 1998 : De l’homo sapiens à l’homme interactif, éd. Denoël, 258 p. 
 1999 : Les Nouveaux Horizons de la consommation, éd. Plon, 266 p. 
 1999 : Du corps machine à la santé harmonique, éd. Plon, 271 p. 
 1999 : La Soif d’émotion, éd. Plon, 271 p. 
 2000 : Les Screenagers, avoir 20 ans en l’an 2000, éd. Plon, 248 p.

Essays 
 2006 : Le Goût du roi : Louis XV et Marie-Louise O'Murphy, éd. Perrin, 327 p. 
 2012 : Scènes de la vie quotidienne a l’Élysée, éd. Plon 
 2015 : Les Derniers Mondains, éd. Plon 
 2016 : Ainsi, Dieu choisit la France, Presses de la Renaissance, 352 p.

Novels 
 2018 : L'Été des quatre rois, éd. Plon 
 2020 : La chambre des dupes, éd. Plon 
 2022 : L'Air était tout en feu, Robert Laffont, 352 p.

References 

1966 births
Living people
Chevaliers of the Ordre des Palmes Académiques
Officiers of the Ordre des Arts et des Lettres
Knights Commander of the Order of St Gregory the Great
Recipients of the Order pro Merito Melitensi
Grand Prix du roman de l'Académie française winners